La Vicomté Castle is a castle located in Wallonia in the municipality of Jodoigne, Walloon Brabant, Belgium.

See also
List of castles in Belgium

Castles in Belgium
Castles in Walloon Brabant
La Vicomte Castle